Formica gagatoides is a species of ant in the family Formicidae. It is found in Europe.

References

Further reading

 

gagatoides
Articles created by Qbugbot
Insects described in 1904